Zhivoye Delo (Vital Cause) was a Menshevik legal weekly newspaper in Russia, published in St. Petersburg from January to April 1912. In total, sixteen issues appeared. Its contributors included L. Martov, F. Dan and P. Axelrod.

References

Defunct newspapers published in Russia
Russian-language newspapers
Defunct weekly newspapers
Newspapers established in 1912
Publications disestablished in 1912
Mass media in Saint Petersburg
1912 establishments in the Russian Empire